The Mil Mi-14 (NATO reporting name: Haze) is a Soviet shore-based nuclear-capable amphibious anti-submarine helicopter derived from the earlier Mi-8.

Design and development
Formal development of an anti-submarine warfare (ASW) version of the Mil Mi-8 transport helicopter was authorised by the Soviet Communist Party Central Committee and Council of Ministers in April 1965, with the objective of replacing the Mil Mi-4 in the short-range, shore based anti-submarine role.

The new design (with the internal designation V-14) differed from the Mi-8 in having a boat-like hull similar to the Sea King, allowing it to operate off the water, and a retractable four-point undercarriage, with the mainwheels retracting into large sponsons on the rear of the fuselage. The helicopter was to be powered by two Klimov TV3-117MT turboshaft engines. A watertight weapons bay is fitted to the centreline of the fuselage allowing internal carriage of a single torpedo or eight depth charges, while a radome housing a search radar is fitted beneath the nose.

The Mi-14 has a crew of four: a pilot, a copilot, an onboard technician, and a weapon system operator. The Mi-14PL anti-submarine version is equipped with a radar, a dipping sonar and a magnetic anomaly detector.

The first prototype V-14, converted from a Mi-8 and powered by the older and less powerful Klimov TV2-117 engines, flew on 1 August 1967. Development was slowed by problems with the helicopter's avionics and due to reliability problems with the TV3-117 engines, with production at Kazan not starting until 1973, and the helicopter (now designated Mi-14) entering service on 11 May 1976.

In January 2016, Russian Helicopters confirmed to Russian News Agency TASS that no final decision to revive production had been taken, but market demand, feasibility studies – including with Moscow's defence ministry – and funding sources were under review. The programme remains a “priority” for Russian Helicopters. The company suggested the Mi-14 would appeal to civil operators in Russia's far north and those supplying the oil and gas industry, alongside the nation's armed forces. Out of the almost 300 Mi-14s produced at Kazan Helicopters between 1973 and 1986, it is estimated that just 44 examples remain in active service.

Variants

V-14
Prototype of the Mi-14 helicopter.
Mi-14PL (NATO Haze-A)
Anti-submarine warfare helicopter, equipped with towed APM-60 MAD, OKA-2 sonobuoys and a retractable Type 12-M search radar, armed with either a single AT-1 or APR-2 torpedo, one Skat nuclear depth bomb or eight depth charges.  A single Mi-14PL was used to carry out trials  with the Kh-23 (NATO designation AS-7 Kerry) air-to-surface missile but this modification does not seem to have entered service.
Mi-14PLM
Improved anti-submarine warfare version with Os'minog ASW suite, with new search radar, dipping sonar and digital computer. Limited use.
Mi-14PŁ/R
Polish conversion of two Mi-14PŁ (Polish designation for Mi-14PL) to search and rescue version, with ASW equipment removed, developed in 2010.
Mi-14BT (NATO Haze-B)
Mine sweeping helicopter with ASW systems removed and equipped for towing Mine Countermeasures sleds. 25–30 built, with six exported to East Germany and two to Bulgaria.
Mi-14PS (NATO Haze-C)
Search and rescue version with search lights and sliding doors with hoist.
Mi-14PX
Search and rescue training helicopter for the Polish Navy (unofficial designation). One Polish Mi-14PŁ helicopter was temporarily converted into the Mi-14PX, then converted back in 1996.
Mi-14PZh

Amphibious firebuster version of Mi-14BT. Conversion price about USD1M.
Mi-14GP
Conversion of Mi-14PL to 24–26 seat civil passenger transport.

Operational history
As part of the Syrian civil war, starting from 2013, Syrian Navy Mi-14 helicopters were used as improvised bombers to drop naval mines and barrel bombs on large area targets from high altitude, mostly cities held by opposing forces. On 22 March 2015, one crashed with its pilot killed on the spot after capture and the rest of the crew captured.

On 7 May 2022, Ukraine confirmed that Colonel Ihor Bedzay, the deputy head of the Ukrainian Navy, was killed when his Mi-14PS was shot down by a Russian Su-35. A video emerged, claimed shot on 7 May 2022, showing a Su-27 family fighter engaging a Mi-14 with its 30 mm gun.

Operators
By 1991, about 230 had been delivered, with exports to many Soviet allies including Bulgaria, Cuba, East Germany, Libya, Poland, and Syria.

Current operators

Georgian Air Force 

Libyan Air Force

Korean People's Army Air Force

Polish Navy

Congolese Navy

Syrian Air Force

Ukrainian Naval Aviation

Yemen Air Force

Former operators

Bulgarian Navy    

Cuban Air Force 

East German Navy 

Ethiopian Air Force

German Navy

Russian Naval Aviation

People's Democratic Republic of Yemen Air Force 

Soviet Naval Aviation

Yugoslav Air Force

Specifications (Mi-14PL)

See also

References

Notes

Citations

Bibliography

 Gunston, Bill. The Osprey Encyclopedia of Russian Aircraft 1875–1995. London: Osprey, 1995. .
 Mladenov, Alexander. "Cutting through the Haze". Air International, March 2001, pp. 184–188. ISSN 0306-5634.
 Mladenov, Alexander. "Cutting through the Haze: Part 2". Air International, April 2001, pp. 244–247. ISSN 0306-5634.

External links

 Walkaround Mi-14PL (Kiev)
 Walkaround Mi-14BT (Kiev)
 Mil Mi-14 page at Aviation.ru website
 Robert Wasilewski Mil Mi-14 page
 Mil Mi-14 for Microsoft Flight Simulator
 Mi-14 Photo Gallery

Amphibious helicopters
Mil aircraft
Anti-submarine helicopters
1960s Soviet anti-submarine aircraft
1960s Soviet helicopters
Twin-turbine helicopters
Aircraft first flown in 1969